This is a list of alumni of Christ's Hospital school, who are known as Old Blues.

Victoria Cross and George Cross holders
Four Old Blues have been awarded the Victoria Cross and two the George Cross.

Victoria Cross
Umbeyla Campaign
Major Henry William Pitcher (1841–1875) (CH 1848–1856)
First World War
Lieutenant-Colonel Wilfrith Elstob (1889–1918)  (CH 1898–1905)
Second Lieutenant Edward Felix Baxter (1885–1916) (CH 1896–1901)
War in Afghanistan
Lance Corporal Joshua Leakey (CH 1999–2006)

George Cross
Second World War
Air Vice Marshal Sir Laurence Sinclair (1908–2001) (CH 1919–1924)

Medicine

Russell Brock – Chest and heart surgeon
Raanan Gillon – Medical doctor, philosopher, journal editor and professor of medical ethics
Norman Guthkelch – British paediatric neurosurgeon
Caesar Hawkins – Surgeon
James Jurin – Physician and scientist
Berkeley Moynihan, 1st Baron Moynihan – Abdominal surgeon

Military

Bertram Allen – Paymaster Rear-Admiral in the Royal Navy
Thomas Bertie – Rear-admiral in the Royal Navy
Pierre Louis Napoleon Cavagnari – Military administrator
John Colborne – British Army Field Marshal
Hugh Constantine – Royal Air Force Air Chief Marshal
Edgar William Cox – Intelligence officer
Alexander Cunningham – Army engineer and archaeologist 
Edward Mortlock Donaldson – Royal Air Force pilot
Michael Gray – Soldier
Buster Howes – Commando and Royal Marines officer
Llewelyn Hughes – Soldier, priest and army chaplain
Robert Hunter - Soldier
Henry Ralph Lumley – Royal Flying Corp pilot and burn victim
Philip Mayne – Soldier
John Robin Stephenson – British Army officer and cricket administrator
Harold Edward Whittingham – Director General of RAF Medical Services in the Second World War
James Alfred Davidson – Royal Navy commander

Music

Taio Cruz – Singer, songwriter, rapper and record producer
Sydney Carter – Poet, songwriter, musician
Sir Colin Davis – Conductor
Tim Benjamin – Composer
Catherine Ennis, organist
Charles Hazlewood – Conductor and broadcaster
Constant Lambert – Composer and conductor
Edward Lambert – Composer
Christopher Tambling – Composer, organist and choirmaster

Performing arts

Roger Allam – Actor
James D'Arcy – Actor
Howard Davies – Theatre and television director
Tenniel Evans – Actor
Susannah Fielding – Actor
Jason Flemyng – Actor
Jimmy Godden – Actor
Leo Gregory – Actor
George Peele – Dramatist
Michael Wilding – Actor

Religion

John Arnold – Anglican priest and author
John Ashe – Priest
Reginald Bazire – Anglican priest
Raymond Birt – Archdeacon of Berkshire
Edmund Campion – Jesuit priest, martyr and saint
Mordecai Cary – Bishop
Thomas Dale – Anglican priest, poet and theologian
John Delight – Archdeacon of Stoke
Vyvyan Henry Donnithorne – Priest and missionary to China
Robert Newton Flew – Methodist theologian
Bede Griffiths – Monk, mystic, theologian, leader in the study of East–West religious dialogue
Thomas Hartwell Horne – Theologian and librarian
Percy Henn – Clergyman and schoolmaster
James Horstead – Bishop of Sierra Leone and Archbishop of West Africa
Ross Hook – Anglican bishop
Marcus Knight – Anglican priest
John Townsend – Congregationalist minister and philanthropist

Science and academia

Donald Allan – Classical scholar
W. Sidney Allen – Linguist and philologist
Richard Appleton – Lecturer in mathematics and theology
 Andrew Barker – Classical scholar
Joshua Barnes – English scholar
John Beazley – Classical scholar
T. A. M. Bishop – Palaeographer, historian, and academic
Arthur Lyon Bowley – Statistician and economist
Rupert Bruce-Mitford – Archaeologist and scholar
Andrew Burn (professor) – Media scholar and educationist
William Burnside – Mathematician
Cyril Burt – Psychologist
Ida Busbridge – Mathematician
William Camden – Antiquarian and historian
Ruth Deech – Academic, lawyer and bioethicist
Robin Du Boulay – Medieval historian
Frederick Field – Theologian and biblical scholar
John Forsdyke – Classical scholar and Director of the British Museum
Cyril Fox – Archaeologist
Louis Harold Gray – Physicist
George Greenhill – Mathematician
Jasper Griffin – Professor of Classics at Oxford
Philip Hall – Mathematician
Roger Highfield – Science author, journalist and broadcaster
Sydney Samuel Hough – Astronomer and mathematician
Beresford Kidd – Anglican priest and Church historian
Philip Kitcher – Professor of philosophy
Norman Longmate – Author, historian and broadcaster
Jeremiah Markland – Classical scholar
Russell Meiggs – Historian
Peter Padfield – Historian
Rex Paterson – Agricultural researcher
Alan Ryan – Professor
James Scholefield – Classical scholar
Barnes Wallis – Scientist, engineer and inventor
Gerald James Whitrow – Mathematician, cosmologist and science historian
F. L. Woodward – Educationist, Pali scholar, author and theosophist
Erik Christopher Zeeman – Mathematician

Sport

Jack Bailey – Cricketer and cricket administrator
Cecil Boden – Cricketer
Robert Edwards – Cricketer and clergyman
Henry Franklin – Cricketer, headmaster and rugby union player
Jack Gentry – Cricketer
Ælfric Harrison – Cricketer
 Ben Allison, Former NCAA D1 Basketball Player for Davidson Wildcats
Andrew Higgins – Rugby union player
George Hill – Rugby union administrator, official and referee 
Joe Launchbury – Rugby union player
James McInerny – Cricketer 
Dennis Silk – Schoolmaster and international cricketer
Geoff Smith – Kent cricketer
John Snow – Cricketer
Stu Whittingham – Cricketer
Douglas Wright – Cricketer

Writers, Poets, and Journalists

Cyrus Andrews – Journalist and radio scriptwriter
Thomas Barnes – Journalist
Robert Black – Author, journalist and translator
Edmund Blunden – Poet, author and critic
Guy Boothby - Author
Mark Burgess – Children's author
Samuel Taylor Coleridge – Poet, romantic, literary critic and philosopher
Kira Cochrane – Journalist and author
Con Coughlin – Journalist and author
James Coomarasamy – Correspondent
Keith Douglas – Poet
Charles Lamb – Essayist
Leigh Hunt – Critic, essayist, and poet
Bernard Levin – Journalist, author and broadcaster
Bryan Magee – Broadcaster, politician, and author
Aylmer Maude – Translator
John Middleton Murry – Writer
Samuel Richardson - Writer
Rupert Thomson – Novelist
Samuel Cobb (poet) – Poet

Horace W. C. Newte – Author
George Dyer – Poet

Politics

Jenkin Coles – Australian politician
Owen Cox – Australian businessman and politician
Samuel Hayden – Canadian politician
Steve Hilton – Political strategist
Stuart Holland – Labour politician and academic
Graham Hutton – Economist, author and Liberal Party politician
Martin Linton – former Labour Member of Parliament
Sir Richard Nichols - Lord Mayor of London
Michael Stewart, Baron Stewart of Fulham – Labour politician

Other

Bob Allen – Army surgeon and journalist
William Bankes Amery – Civil servant and accountant
Edmund Bartley-Denniss – Barrister, member of parliament, freemason and British cycling pioneer
Francis Bullen - Judge
Thomas Cass – Surveyor
Richard Cavendish – Occult writer
Richard Clarke – Civil servant
Henry Cole – Civil servant and inventor
Edward Colston – Slave trader
Richard Dagley – Painter and illustrator
Arthur Dorman – Industrialist
Jeremiah Duggan, who died in disputed circumstances in 2003
 John Edmonds – Trade Union Leader
Thomas Everard – Mayor of Williamsburg, Virginia
Alan Fletcher – Designer and founder of Pentagram
Rob Gauntlett – Adventurer, explorer and motivational speaker
David Green – Director of the Serious Fraud Office
Francis Seymour Haden – Etcher and surgeon
Harold Harding – Civil engineer
Daniel Harper – Headmaster and Principal of Jesus College, Oxford
Lucy Herron – Founder and director of charity Msizi Africa
James Hooper – Adventurer
Donald Hopson – Diplomat
Rupert Jackson – Lord Justice of Appeal
Geraint Jennings – Jersey politician and linguist
Gabriel Jones – Welsh American lawyer, legislator, court clerk and civil servant in the colony (and later U.S. state) of Virginia
Edward Keane – Australian engineer, businessman, and politician
William Charles Goddard Knowles – British businessman in Hong Kong
Arthur Ling – architect and urban planner
Henry James Sumner Maine – Comparative jurist and historian
David Norgrove – Businessman
William Nye – Principal Private Secretary to the Prince of Wales and the Duchess of Cornwall, 2011–2015
Phillip Osborne – Explorer
Augustus Welby Northmore Pugin – Architect, designer, and theorist of design
Percy Pyne – President of City National Bank in the United States
Tony Ray-Jones – Photographer
John Septimus Roe – Surveyor-General of Western Australia
George Ritchie Sandford – Barrister, Financial Secretary of Palestine (1940–1944), Chief Secretary of Tanganyika (1944–1946), Governor of the Bahamas (1950)
Jonathan Scott – Wildlife photographer and TV presenter
Stephan Shakespeare – Business man and entrepreneur
David Simon, Baron Simon of Highbury – Business man
Charles Robert Smith – Governor of North Borneo
Chris Steele-Perkins – Photographer
William Alder Strange – Headmaster and author
Mark Thomas – Comedian and political activist
Edward Thornton – Diplomat
Richard Thornton –  Merchant and trader
Sir Ian Trethowan – Former Director-General of the BBC and journalist
Keith Vaughan – Painter
Alexander Vidal – US Land surveyor, banker and political figure 
Holly Walsh – Comedian
E F Watling – Schoolmaster, classical scholar and translator
James White (1775-1820) – Advertising agent

References

Christ's Hospital
 
Christ